Chrysopogon gryllus is a perennial bunchgrass of the family Poaceae, native to Europe and tropical and temperate Asia.

Spikelets are associated in threes, of which the fertile one is unisexual with the other two staminal or not completely developed. The fruit is corn seed.

References

 Bor, N. L. 1960. The grasses of Burma, Ceylon, India, and Pakistan.
 Davis, P. H., ed. 1965–1988. Flora of Turkey and the east Aegean islands.
 Mouterde, P. 1966–. Nouvelle flore du Liban et de la Syrie.
 Nasir, E. & S. I. Ali, eds. 1970–. Flora of [West] Pakistan.
 Rechinger, K. H., ed. 1963–. Flora iranica.
 Shukla, U. 1996. Grasses of north-eastern India.
 Townsend, C. C. & E. Guest. 1966–. Flora of Iraq
 Turrill, W. B. et al., eds. 1952–. Flora of Tropical East Africa.
 Tutin, T. G. et al., eds. 1964–1980. Flora europaea.
 Tzvelev, N. N. 1976. Zlaki SSSR.
 Veldkamp, J. F. 1999. A revision of Chrysopogon Trin., including Vetiveria Bory (Poaceae) in Thailand and Malesia with notes on some other species from Africa and Australia. Austrobaileya 5:525–526.

External links

 
 Black Sea Environmental Internet Node entry — United Nations Environment Programme.

gryllus
Bunchgrasses of Asia
Bunchgrasses of Europe
Flora of Western Asia
Flora of the Indian subcontinent
Grasses of India
Grasses of Pakistan